St. Xavier's English Medium School, Manickpur, was founded by the Society of Jesus in 2006. It is located in Manickpur, Vasai Town, Mahārāshtra, India.

The school is affiliated to the CICSE board.

See also
 List of Jesuit sites

References

Jesuit secondary schools in India
Christian schools in Maharashtra
High schools and secondary schools in Maharashtra
Education in Palghar district
Educational institutions established in 2006
2006 establishments in Maharashtra